The NCAA Division I Football Bowl Subdivision (FBS), formerly known as Division I-A, is the highest level of college football in the United States. The FBS consists of the largest schools in the National Collegiate Athletic Association (NCAA). As of the 2023 season, there are 10 conferences and 133 schools in FBS.

College football is one of the most popular spectator sports throughout much of the United States. The top schools generate tens of millions of dollars in yearly revenue. Top FBS teams draw tens of thousands of fans to games, and the ten largest American stadiums by capacity all host FBS teams or games. Since July 1, 2021, college athletes have been able to get paid for the use of their image and likeness. Prior to this date colleges were only allowed to provide players with non-monetary compensation such as athletic scholarships that provide for tuition, housing, and books.

Unlike other NCAA divisions and subdivisions, the NCAA does not officially award an FBS football national championship, nor does it sanction a playoff tournament to determine such a champion on the field. Instead, organizations such as the Associated Press and AFCA have historically sought to rank the teams and crown a national champion, by taking a vote of sports writers and coaches, respectively. In place of such a playoff, various cities across the United States hold their own post-season contests, called bowl games, in which they traditionally invite teams to participate in them. Historically, these bowl games were mostly considered to be exhibition games involving a payout to participating teams. However, in the modern era they are considered the de facto post-season. There have been agreements in recent decades (such as the Bowl Coalition from 1992 to 1994, the Bowl Alliance from 1995 to 1997, the Bowl Championship Series from 1998 to 2013, and the College Football Playoff from 2014 to the present) by the premier FBS conferences and bowl games to organize matchups so that the FBS national championship is decided on the field.

Overview

The FBS is the highest level of college football in the United States, and FBS players make up the vast majority of the players picked in the NFL Draft. For every sport but football, the NCAA divides schools into three major divisions: Divisions I, II, and III. However, in football, Division I is further divided into two sub-divisions: the Bowl Subdivision, abbreviated as the FBS, and the Championship Subdivision, abbreviated as the FCS. Divisions are themselves further divided up into conferences, which are groupings of schools that play each other in contention for a conference championship. The FBS currently has ten conferences, which are often divided into the "Power Five conferences" and the less prominent "Group of Five".

Although FCS programs can draw thousands of fans per game, many FCS schools attempt to join the FBS in hopes of increased revenue, corporate sponsorship, alumni donations, prestige, and national exposure. However, FBS programs also face increased expenses in regards to staff salaries, facility improvements, and scholarships. The athletic departments of many FBS schools lose money every year, and these athletic departments must rely on subsidies from the rest of the university. In many states, the highest-paid public employee is the head coach of an FBS team. FBS schools are limited to a total of 85 football players receiving financial assistance. Nearly all FBS schools that are not on NCAA probation give 85 full scholarships.

In order to retain FBS membership, schools must meet several requirements. FBS schools must have an average home attendance of at least 15,000 (over a rolling two-year period). An FBS school must sponsor a minimum of 16 varsity intercollegiate teams (including football), with at least six men's or coeducational teams and at least eight all-female teams. Across all sports, each FBS school must offer at least 200 athletic scholarships (or spend at least $4 million on athletic scholarships) per year, and FBS football teams must provide at least 90% of the maximum number of football scholarships (which is currently 85).

Scheduling

The FBS season begins in late August or early September and ends in January with the College Football Playoff National Championship game. Most FBS teams play 12 regular season games per year, with eight or nine of those games coming against conference opponents. All ten FBS conferences hold a conference championship game to determine the winner of the conference. Between conference games, non-conference games, a conference championship game, and up to two bowl games if ranked among the top four college teams in the country by the College Football Playoff Committee. Only the four Playoff teams are eligible to participate in two bowl games in one post-season, and only the winners of the two playoff semifinal bowl games will play a 15th game when they meet in the College Football Playoff National Championship. The Hawaii Rainbow Warriors and teams that play at Hawaii get a special exemption and are allowed to play a thirteenth regular season game in order to defray travel costs, so an FBS team that plays 13 regular season games, a conference championship game, a semifinal bowl game, and in the national championship game could theoretically play 16 games in a season. No team has played a 16th game in one season, due to the unlikelihood of a team playing Hawaii at some point, finishing the season ranked in the top four, opting in to a 13th regular season game, and then winning a Playoff semifinal game. The theoretical 16th game has only been possible since the beginning of the College Football Playoff era in the 2014 season. Furthermore, the college football playoff will expand to 12 teams starting in the 2024 season, and, with its new bracket format, means that a team could potentially play in up to 18 games.

For non-conference regular season games, FBS teams are free to schedule match-ups against any other FBS team, regardless of conference. A small number of FBS teams are independent, and have total control over their own schedule. Non-conference games are scheduled by mutual agreement and often involve "home and homes" (where teams alternate as hosts) and long-established rivalries. A 2014 study found that teams from the stronger conferences frequently play non-conference games against teams from the weaker conferences or, occasionally, against FCS teams. FBS teams are free to schedule up to forty percent of their games against FCS teams, but FBS teams can only use one win per season against an FCS team for the purposes of bowl eligibility. Additionally, the FCS opponent must have averaged at least 90% of the FCS limit of 63 scholarship equivalents over a rolling two-year period. An FBS team must schedule a total of five home games per year; for the purposes of scheduling, a "home game" must take place at a venue in which the team plays 50% of its "home games", although a team is allowed to count one neutral-site game against an FBS team toward the "home game" requirement. FBS-FCS games, known as "money games," are often home games for the FBS team, and victories by FCS teams are usually considered to be upsets. FCS teams receive hundreds of thousands of dollars for their participation in these games.

The Football Bowl Subdivision gets its name from the bowl games that many FBS teams play at the end of the year, although other college divisions also have their own bowl games. FBS bowl games are played at the end of the season in December or January, and collectively generate over $400 million per year as of 2012. For the 2017–18 bowl season, there were 40 bowl games. In order to be bowl eligible, an FBS team must have a winning record. In certain cases, 5–7 and 6–7 teams can also be selected to bowls, usually to fill bowl vacancies.

Many bowls have an established conference tie-in; for example, the Cheez-It Bowl provides a match-up between teams from ACC and the Big 12. A small number of long-established bowls played a major role in the Bowl Championship Series, which was used to select the national champion until the 2013 season, and these bowls continue to play a major role in the College Football Playoff. Under the playoff, there are six major bowls, known as the New Year's Six, with automatic bids going to the conference champions of the Power Five conferences and the top-ranked member of the "Group of Five." Two of these bowls serve as semi-final games to the College Football Playoff National Championship game. Conferences receive millions of dollars for each school that appears in the playoff, and appearances in other bowls are also quite lucrative. In addition to the regular bowls, some post-season bowls, such as the NFLPA Collegiate Bowl, match up teams of all-stars and NFL Draft entrants.

History

College football has been played for over one hundred years, but the game and the organizational structure of college football have evolved significantly during that time. The first college football game was played in 1869, but the game continued to develop during the late 19th and early 20th century. During this period, Walter Camp pioneered the concept of a line of scrimmage, the system of downs, and the College Football All-America Team. The 1902 Rose Bowl was the first bowl game in college football history, and the event began to be held annually starting with the 1916 Rose Bowl. In the 1930s, other bowl games came into existence, including the Sugar Bowl, the Cotton Bowl Classic, and the Orange Bowl. The 1906 college football season was the first season played under the IAAUS (which would later change its name to the NCAA) and the first season in which the forward pass was legal. The IAAUS had formed after President Theodore Roosevelt, responding to several deaths that had occurred during football games, requested that colleges find ways to make football a safer sport. 

In 1935, the Heisman Trophy was presented for the first time; the award is generally considered to be college football's most prestigious individual award. In 1965, the NCAA voted to allow the platoon system, in which different players played on offense and defense; teams had previously experimented with the concept in the 1940s. In 1968, the NCAA began allowing freshmen to compete in games; freshmen had previously been required to take a redshirt year. In 1975, after a growth of "grants-in-aid" (scholarships given for athletic rather than academic or need-based reasons), the NCAA voted to limit the number of athletic scholarships each school could offer. In 1968, the NCAA required all teams to identify as members of either the University Division (for larger schools) or the College Division (for smaller schools), and in 1973, the NCAA divided into three divisions. At the urging of several larger schools seeking increased autonomy and commonality, Division I-A was formed prior to the 1978 season; the remaining teams in Division I formed the Football Championship Subdivision or FCS (then known as Division I-AA). In 1981, members of the College Football Association attempted to create a fourth division consisting solely of the most competitive schools, but this effort was defeated. In the 1992 season, the SEC split into divisions and played the first FBS conference championship game. The Big 12 and Western Athletic Conference did the same for the 1996 season, and most conferences eventually adopted divisions and championship games.

The NCAA does not officially award an FBS football championship, but several teams have claimed national championships. Other organizations have also sought to rank the teams and crown a national champion. The Dickinson System and other methods were formed in the early 20th century to select the best team in the country, and the AP Poll and the Coaches Poll began rankings teams in the middle of the 20th century. In many seasons, selectors such as the AP and the Coaches Poll designated different teams as national champions. Often, more than one team would finish undefeated, as the top teams were not guaranteed to play each other during the regular season or in bowl games. In 1992, five major conferences established the Bowl Coalition in order to determine the FBS champion. In 1998, the two remaining major conferences joined with the other five conferences to form the Bowl Championship Series. The BCS used a rankings system to match up the top two teams in the BCS National Championship Game. However, even the BCS era saw split national championships, as in 2003 the AP Poll and the Coaches Poll selected different national champions. The College Football Playoff, with a four-team field, replaced the BCS starting with the 2014 season.

Currently as of March 2020, there is no unified system to provide FBS football players with financial compensation aside from collegiate scholarships. Leading the forefront of the movement on compensation is California governor Gavin Newsom. He stated, "Collegiate student athletes put everything on the line — their physical health, future career prospects and years of their lives to compete. Colleges reap billions from these student athletes' sacrifices and success but, in the same breath, block them from earning a single dollar," he said in a statement. "That's a bankrupt model — one that puts institutions ahead of the students they are supposed to serve. It needs to be disrupted." Newsom passed a law in California called the "Fair Play to Pay Act" making it the first state to allow student athletes to profit off their name, image and likeness. The law is scheduled to go in effect on January 1, 2023.

Television

College football was first broadcast on radio in 1921, and first broadcast on television in 1939. Television became profitable for both schools and the NCAA, which tightly controlled the airing of games in the 1950s, 1960s, and 1970s. The NCAA limited each football team to six television appearances over a two-year period. The 1981 Supreme Court case NCAA v. Board of Regents of the University of Oklahoma & University of Georgia granted television rights to individual schools as opposed to the NCAA and allowed teams to televise all of their games. After a period during which FBS schools negotiated collectively under the College Football Association, Notre Dame's 1991 television contract ushered in an era in which schools and conferences negotiate their own television contracts. This new era of television led to several waves of conference realignment, most notably in 1996, 2005, and the early 2010s. FBS games continue to be a major draw on television, as over 26 million people watched the 2014 BCS National Championship Game.

National networks such as CBS, ABC, NBC, several ESPN networks, and several Fox networks have all covered the FBS, as have several regional and local networks. As conferences negotiate their own television deals, each conference is affiliated with a network that airs its home games. In the mid-2000s, college and conferences began to create their own television networks; such networks include the Big Ten Network, BYUtv, the Longhorn Network, and the Pac-12 Network. In 2012, college football games drew over 400 million viewers.

Teams and conferences

Conferences

History
The Big Ten (then popularly known as the Western Conference) was founded in 1896, after which several other schools joined together to form conferences, including the Pacific Coast Conference, the MVIAA, the Southwest Conference, the Southern Conference, the Mountain States Conference (also known as the Skyline Conference), and the Border Conference. In 1928, six schools seceded from the MVIAA to form the Big Six Conference, which later expanded to the Big Eight in 1957; the remaining schools formed the Missouri Valley Conference. In 1932, several Southern schools formed the SEC after breaking away from the Southern Conference, and in 1953 several more schools seceded from the Southern Conference to form the ACC. In 1946, several Midwestern schools formed the MAC. Several elite Northeastern schools had formed the Eastern Intercollegiate Basketball League in 1901, and its members (plus Brown University, not an EIBL member at the time) signed the Ivy Group Agreement, which governed football competition between the signatories, in 1945; the Ivy League was formally founded in 1954, when the agreement was extended to cover all sports. In 1959, the Pacific Coast Conference dissolved, and most of its former members formed the new Athletic Association of Western Universities, which became the Pac-8 when more former PCC members joined. In 1962, several schools from the Mountain States Conference and the Border Conference formed the Western Athletic Conference. In 1969, the Pacific Coast Athletic Association (PCAA), later known as the Big West Conference, was formed by several Division II California schools that sought to join Division I.

Division I separated into Division I-A (the predecessor to the FBS) and I-AA (predecessor of the FCS) prior to the 1978 season. At that time, there were several independent I-A schools and twelve Division I-A conferences: the Southeastern Conference (SEC), Big Ten, Pacific-10 (Pac-10), Big 8, Southwest Conference (SWC), Western Athletic Conference (WAC), PCAA (which later changed its name to the Big West), Missouri Valley Conference, Southern Conference, Atlantic Coast Conference (ACC), Mid-American Conference (MAC), and the Ivy League. The Ivy League and the Southern Conference left for Division I-AA prior to the 1982 season, while the Missouri Valley Conference stopped sponsoring football prior to the 1985 season. In 1991, the Big East recruited several independents and began sponsoring football, becoming a major conference. In 1996, Conference USA (C-USA), formed the previous year by the merger of the non-football Metro and Great Midwest Conferences, also began sponsoring football. That same year, the Southwest Conference dissolved, and four of its former members joined with the Big 8 to form the Big 12 Conference. In 1999, eight schools broke away from the WAC to form the Mountain West Conference (MW). Prior to the 2000 season, the Big West stopped sponsoring football. The Sun Belt Conference began sponsoring football in 2001. After periods of conference realignment in 2005 and the early 2010s that saw the expansion of the ACC, Big Ten, SEC, and Pac-10 (which changed its name to the Pac-12), the WAC reorganized as a non-football conference and the Big East split into the American Athletic Conference and a new non-football conference that retained the Big East name.

Current conferences

Most of the 131 FBS schools are members of an FBS conference, but there are also a small number of independent schools. Since the Western Athletic Conference discontinued football sponsorship prior to the 2013 season, there have been ten conferences in the FBS. All of the FBS conferences have between ten and fourteen members, although independent Notre Dame has a scheduling agreement with the fourteen-member ACC. The ten conferences are split into two groups for the purposes of the College Football Playoff. The "Power Five conferences" consist of most of the largest and best-known college athletic programs in the country. A school from one of the Power Five conferences won every BCS National Championship Game (which operated from 1999 to 2014), and has won every College Football Playoff National Championship. The remaining five conferences are known as the "Group of Five." Any conference may split its teams into two divisions, and as of the 2022 season, the American Athletic Conference, Big 12 Conference, Pac-12 Conference, and Conference USA do not use divisions. The American, the Big 12, and C-USA all previously utilized division systems before abandoning them after losing some of their member schools to realignment: UConn left the American in July 2020, and Marshall, Old Dominion, and Southern Miss left the C-USA in July 2022, leaving both those conferences with an odd number of members, while the Big 12 has not used divisions since the early-2010s conference realignment left it with 10 members. The Pac-12, however, chose to abandon divisions entirely as a result of the NCAA Division I Council ruling that conferences would no longer be required to maintain divisions in order to hold a conference championship. It was the first conference to entirely abandon divisions due to this, with the Atlantic Coast Conference and Mountain West Conference announcing similar intentions for 2023. As of the 2018 season, all conferences hold a championship game that determines the conference champion. The Sun Belt was the last conference to launch a championship game, as well as the most recent to split into divisions for football, with both the title game and the divisional alignment debuting in 2018. That conference chose to form football divisions despite having only 10 football members.

† "Big Five" or "Power Five" conferences with guaranteed berths in the "access bowls" associated with the College Football Playoff

Notes

Transitional teams

Georgia Southern University in Statesboro, Georgia joined the Sun Belt Conference upon transitioning to the FBS level in 2014. Prior to joining the Sun Belt, GASOU won six FCS (I-AA) national championships and have produced two Walter Payton Award winners. The Eagles first continuously fielded a football team in 1924; however, play was suspended for World War II and revived in 1981. The Eagles competed as an FCS independent from 1984 until 1992 as the Eagles' main conference at the time, the Trans America Athletic Conference (now known as the ASUN Conference), did not sponsor football, and as a member of the Southern Conference from 1993 until 2013, winning 10 SoCon championships.

The Georgia Southern Eagles finished their first FBS season 9–3 overall and was undefeated in Sun Belt Conference play at 8–0; winning the Sun Belt Conference championship outright in its first year as an FBS member. They were also the first team ever to go unbeaten in conference play in their first FBS season. Since the Eagles were under transitional status, the university filed for a postseason waiver to allow the Eagles to play in a bowl game; however, the NCAA denied Georgia Southern's waiver request and a subsequent appeal since enough full member FBS teams became bowl-eligible during the season. 

Liberty University, the most recent school to complete an FBS transition, began its FBS transition process on July 1, 2017. The NCAA granted the school a waiver from its normal transition rules that require an invitation from an FBS conference before beginning the transition. The Flames played in the Big South Conference in 2017 but were not eligible for the FCS playoffs. For 2018 to 2022, the Flames became an FBS independent. The school initially intended to remain a Big South member in other sports until it received an invitation to an FBS conference, but instead joined the non-football ASUN Conference in 2018. Conference USA (C-USA) eventually announced in November 2021 Liberty's future addition to that conference, with Flames football moving to C-USA starting in the 2023 season.

Three schools began FBS transitions on July 1, 2022. James Madison University joined the Sun Belt after meeting the NCAA minimum of five FBS opponents at its home stadium, as required and scheduled. This happened after James Madison's FCS conference, the all-sports Colonial Athletic Association (CAA), barred the Dukes from competing in or hosting team championships in any sport for that conference during the 2021–22 season according to CAA bylaws. (The CAA football league, branded as CAA Football, is technically a separate entity from the all-sports CAA.) However, the Dukes were eligible for at-large bids to all NCAA team championships in 2021–22. By meeting FBS scheduling requirements in 2022, JMU skipped one year of the normal two-year transition process, making it eligible for bowl games in 2023. On July 1, 2023, two outgoing FCS teams Jacksonville State and Sam Houston are moving to C-USA.

The next school to start an FBS transition will be Kennesaw State University, which will start its transition in 2023 ahead of its move to Conference USA in 2024.

Realignment
The FBS has experienced several realignments since its formation in 1978, with many teams changing conferences, dropping out of the FBS, or moving up from the FCS. In 1982, the size of the division was cut considerably, and the Southern Conference and the Ivy League were demoted to the FCS. In 1985, the Missouri Valley Conference stopped sponsoring football. In the 1980s and 1990s, several independents joined conferences, dropped football, or joined the FCS. In the 1996 NCAA conference realignment, the Southwest Conference dissolved, and four Texas teams from that conference joined with the Big 8 schools to form the Big 12 Conference. The Western Athletic Conference expanded to sixteen members, but half of the schools left in 1999 to form the Mountain West Conference. Conference USA (C-USA) formed from a merger of the Metro Conference and the Great Midwest Conference, two conferences which had not sponsored football. The Big West stopped sponsoring football after the 2000 season, and was essentially replaced by the Sun Belt Conference, which added former Big West members and began sponsoring football in 2001. In the mid-2000s, the Big East added former basketball-only member Connecticut, while Temple left the conference (before eventually returning in 2013). During another phase of realignment in 2005, three schools jumped from the Big East to the ACC. The Big East responded by adding schools from Conference USA.

College football underwent another major conference realignment in the first half of the 2010s. Members of the Big East left the conference to join the Big 12 and ACC. The Big 12 lost members to the SEC, the Pac-12, and the Big Ten, while the Big Ten also gained one former ACC member. The remaining members of the Big East split into two conferences: the American Athletic Conference ("The American") and a new conference that assumed the Big East name but does not sponsor football. The American added several schools from C-USA, but lost one school each to the ACC and Big Ten after its first season. In turn, C-USA added FCS schools and schools from the Sun Belt Conference. The Sun Belt Conference replenished its membership by adding FCS schools and schools from the Western Athletic Conference. The Mountain West lost schools to the Big 12, Pac-12, and the FBS independent ranks, and added several schools from the WAC. After several defections, leaving the conference with only two football-sponsoring schools remaining, the WAC dropped its sponsorship of football.

The early-2010s realignment cycle also affected the FBS independent ranks. BYU left the MW in 2011 for football independence and the non-football West Coast Conference. In 2013, Idaho and New Mexico State, the last two football-sponsoring schools in the WAC, became FBS independents, but would return to their former football home of the Sun Belt Conference as football-only members the following year. Also in 2013, Notre Dame became a full but non-football member of the ACC, entering into a scheduling agreement with that conference that calls for the Fighting Irish football team to play five games each season against ACC schools, and to play each other ACC school at least once every three years. Finally, in 2015, Navy became a football-only member of The American, ending more than a century of football independence.

Realignment continued at a lower level through the rest of the 2010s and into the early 2020s. Georgia Southern joined the Sun Belt Conference upon transitioning to the FBS level in 2014. The Eagles won the Sun Belt Conference championship outright in its first year as an FBS member. The 2016 season saw FCS Coastal Carolina join the Sun Belt Conference for non-football sports while beginning a transition to FBS football; the football team joined the Sun Belt in 2017. That season was also the last for Idaho and New Mexico State as Sun Belt football members. After 2017, New Mexico State returned to independent status, while Idaho downgraded to FCS football—becoming the first program ever to voluntarily do so—and added football to its all-sports membership in the Big Sky Conference. Also in 2016, UMass went independent after turning down an offer of full membership in the Mid-American Conference. Most recently, UConn went independent in 2020 when the school left The American to rejoin many of its historic basketball rivals in the current Big East Conference. Notre Dame competed under a full ACC schedule only also in 2020 in response to logistical concerns that arose from the effects of COVID-19.

The most recent realignment is currently ongoing, starting with the announcements by Oklahoma and Texas that they would leave the Big 12 for the SEC no later than 2025. The Big 12 and its departing members later announced a 2024 departure date. The first actual conference changes came in 2022, with the Sun Belt gaining Marshall, returning Old Dominion, and Southern Miss from C-USA, and FCS upgrader James Madison. The following year sees C-USA add Jacksonville State, Sam Houston (both from FCS), New Mexico State and Liberty (FBS independents) but lose Charlotte, Florida Atlantic, North Texas, Rice, UAB, and UTSA to The American. In turn, The American will lose Cincinnati, Houston, and UCF to the Big 12, which will also add former football independent BYU. In 2024, Oklahoma and Texas join the SEC, UCLA and USC will leave the Pac-12 for the Big Ten, and Kennesaw State will upgrade to FBS and join C-USA.

Awards

Several awards are given each year to players and coaches in the FBS. Although all college football players are eligible for many of these awards (such as the Heisman Trophy), FBS players usually win these awards, and other awards (such as the Walter Payton Award) exist to honor players in other divisions and the FCS. In addition to the national awards listed below, FBS conferences also have their own awards, and several organizations release a yearly College Football All-America Team. In 1951, the National Football Foundation established the College Football Hall of Fame. Notable individual awards include:
Best/most valuable player: Heisman Trophy, Maxwell Award, Walter Camp Award, Archie Griffin Award, AP Player of the Year, SN Player of the Year, Lombardi Award (originally lineman/linebacker, but expanded to all players in 2016)
 Defensive player of the year: Chuck Bednarik Award, Bronko Nagurski Trophy, Lott Trophy
 Position awards: Dave Rimington Trophy (Center), Davey O'Brien Award and Manning Award (Quarterback), Dick Butkus Award (Linebacker), Doak Walker Award (Running back), Fred Biletnikoff Award (Wide receiver), Jim Thorpe Award (Defensive back), John Mackey Award (Tight end), Lou Groza Award (Placekicker), Outland Trophy (Interior lineman), Ray Guy Award (Punter), Ted Hendricks Award (Defensive end), Jet Award (Return Specialist)
 Non-positional playing awards: Paul Hornung Award (most versatile player), Burlsworth Trophy (top player who began his college career as a walk-on), Jon Cornish Trophy (top Canadian player)
Coaching awards:
 Head coaches: AFCA Coach of the Year, Eddie Robinson Coach of the Year, SN Coach of the Year, Walter Camp Coach of the Year Award, Paul "Bear" Bryant Award, Home Depot Coach of the Year Award, AP Coach of the Year
 Assistants: Broyles Award, AFCA Assistant Coach of the Year
Other awards: William V. Campbell Trophy, Wuerffel Trophy, Rudy Award, Amos Alonzo Stagg Award, Walter Camp Man of the Year, Theodore Roosevelt Award

The NCAA does not officially name a national champion, but several other organizations name national champions and all conferences participate in the College Football Playoff in order to determine a champion. The winner of the College Football Playoff receives the College Football Playoff National Championship Trophy. The AP awards the AP National Championship Trophy, while the American Football Coaches Association awards the AFCA National Championship Trophy. The AFCA trophy was previously awarded to the winner of the BCS National Championship Game (a predecessor of the College Football Playoff National Championship game), which operated from 1999 to 2014. The Football Writers Association of America awarded the Grantland Rice Trophy until after the 2013 season, and the National Football Foundation awards the MacArthur Bowl. Since the disputed end of the 2003 season, the various organizations have been able to agree on a single national champion.

Maps of teams

1927
1927 map of teams

1956
1956 map of teams

1991
1991 map of teams

2023
2023 map of teams

Transitioned schools
Schools that have transitioned to the FBS

Programs by state
Conference affiliations are current for the upcoming 2023 season.

Alabama

Arizona

Arkansas

California

Colorado

Connecticut

Florida

Georgia

Hawaii

Idaho

Illinois

Indiana

Iowa

Kansas

Kentucky

Louisiana

Maryland

Massachusetts

Michigan

Minnesota

Mississippi

Missouri

Nebraska

Nevada

New Jersey

New Mexico

New York

North Carolina

Ohio

Oklahoma

Oregon

Pennsylvania

South Carolina

Tennessee

Texas

Utah

Virginia

Washington

West Virginia

Wisconsin

Wyoming

Nine states (Alaska, Delaware, Maine, Montana, New Hampshire, North Dakota, Rhode Island, South Dakota, Vermont) and Washington, D.C. do not have FBS programs.

See also

 List of NCAA Division I non-football programs

References